Ocean Wave was an American racehorse.

Ocean Wave or Ocean Waves may also refer to:

 Ocean Wave (sidewheeler), an 1890s steamboat in Oregon and Washington, United States
 Ocean Wave (shipwreck), a site on Lake Michigan that is listed on the U.S. National Register of Historic Places
 Ocean Waves (film), a film by Studio Ghibli (also known as I Can Hear the Sea)

See also
 Wind wave, which includes waves in the ocean